Ruby Gentry is a 1952 film directed by King Vidor, and starring Jennifer Jones, Charlton Heston, and Karl Malden. In February 2020, the film was shown at the 70th Berlin International Film Festival, as part of a retrospective dedicated to King Vidor's career.

In 1960, the movie and the title character were the inspiration for Roberta Lee Streeter to sing under the name Bobbie Gentry.

Plot
Ruby Corey, a poor backwoods girl living in the small North Carolina town of Braddock, is still in love with Boake Tackman. During high school, Ruby had rebuffed his aggressive advances, and was taken in for a couple of years by a kind wealthy businessman and his wife, who protected her and taught her the skills a lady would need. She moved back home when her father needed her help. Boake's family used to be wealthy, but after generations of profligacy all he has left is the land he drained and farmed. He starts a relationship with her but plans to marry a local woman with a rich family. When she hears the news, Ruby marries her widowed, former benefactor, Mr. Jim Gentry, despite not loving him.

Her background keeps her from being accepted by most of Jim's peers, most of whom decline to attend their after-wedding party. While at another party, Jim gets into a fistfight with Boake after witnessing him dancing with Ruby. Jim calls Ruby a tramp who looks like a lady but doesn't behave like one. She leaves in tears, and later that night, he apologizes. The next day Jim and Ruby go sailing, where he tells her he "doesn't mind being second best" and she admits she really does love him. A loose rope results in Jim being knocked overboard by the boom, leaving Ruby widowed and distraught.

The local paper writes that she is a gold-digger who murdered Jim for his fortune and mentions the fistfight between Jim and Boake. Jim's friends renounce her and she receives accusatory phone calls and harassment from the townspeople. Ruby uses Jim's money to begin a campaign against everyone who slighted her, calling in debts to close down people's businesses as well as the newspaper that slandered her. Her brother comes to beg her for leniency, but she throws him out, warning she is just getting started. When Boake visits, she gives him the promissary-note he had signed and which was acquired by Gentry, and offers to run off with him, but he rejects her, saying that for all her money she can't buy her way out of the swamp, and she can't buy him.

Ruby has Boake's land flooded, ruining the crops. After seeing her fury, he goes back to her. Boake and Ruby go to her father's annual duck-hunting party where she goes back to her country roots and Boake drinks away his resentment before visiting her room late at night.

While hunting the next day, Boake turns on Ruby in retaliation for her actions but she apologizes. Just then, her estranged brother Jewel Corey begins to shoot at the couple while quoting Bible verses about the wickedness of women and sinners who must be struck down. They try to hide in the swamp but Jewel shoots Boake in the abdomen, killing him; Ruby goes after Jewel and guns him down. Cradling Boake in her arms, Ruby laments her decisions.

Ruby later becomes the skipper of a fishing boat, forever looked down upon by the townspeople.

Cast

Theme song

The film's theme song, "Ruby", was composed by Heinz Eric Roemheld. At the time of the film's release, the theme enjoyed much popularity in orchestral recordings by Les Baxter, with harmonica solo by Danny Welton., Victor Young And His Singing Strings with George Fields on harmonica (Columbia DO-70040, Australia), Richard Hayman And His Orchestra with Richard Hayman on harmonica, and Jerry Murad and the Harmonicats. It has subsequently become a jazz and pop standard, both as an instrumental and with lyrics by Mitchell Parish, recorded by such artists as Ray Charles and Neil Diamond, Les Welch & His Orchestra, with vocals by Richard Gray (Festival-Manhattan FM75, a shellac 78 in Australia), and Vic Damone, on his 1962 Capitol album The Lively Ones (Capitol T1748).

Reception 
On the review aggregator website Rotten Tomatoes, the film holds a rating of 63% based on 8 reviews with an average rating of 6.7/10.

References

External links 

 
 
 
 
 
 

1952 films
1952 drama films
20th Century Fox films
American drama films
American black-and-white films
1950s English-language films
Films about social class
Films directed by King Vidor
Films scored by Heinz Roemheld
Films set in North Carolina
Southern Gothic films
1950s American films